Sowers and Reapers is a lost 1917 silent film feature produced by Rolfe Photoplays and distributed by Metro Pictures. George D. Baker directed and Emmy Wehlen starred.

Cast
 Emmy Wehlen as Annie Leigh
 George Christie as Earle Courtney
 Frank Currier as Major James Courtney
 Peggy Parr as Sadie Jones
 Harry Davenport as Henry Ainsworth
 Claire McCormack as Ella Burt
 Emanuel A. Turner as Paul Rooubais
 Walter Horton as Len Peters
 Kate Blancke as Mrs. Leigh
 David Thompson as William Jenkins
 Grace Saum as Ethel Ainsworth (*as Grace Saums)

References

External links

 

1917 films
American silent feature films
Films directed by George D. Baker
Lost American films
1917 drama films
American black-and-white films
Silent American drama films
Metro Pictures films
1917 lost films
Lost drama films
1910s American films
1910s English-language films